Luniemu Airport  is an airport serving the village of Luniemu in Haut-Lomami Province, Democratic Republic of the Congo.

See also

Transport in the Democratic Republic of the Congo
List of airports in the Democratic Republic of the Congo

References

External links
 FallingRain - Luniemu Airport
 OpenStreetMap - Luniemu Airport
 HERE Maps - Luniemu
 OurAirports - Luniemu
 

Airports in Haut-Lomami